The Glasgow University Conservative & Unionist Association (GUCUA) was founded in 1836 at the University of Glasgow, and is the oldest University Conservative association in the United Kingdom. It was formed as a branch of the Federation of Conservative Students and of the Young Conservatives, and remains affiliated to the Scottish Conservative Party and the Scottish Young Conservatives. Its main aim is to promote Conservative and Unionist principles on campus and to provide a safe-space for Conservative debate.

History
Its original name was the Peel Club, and was formed after Robert Peel's 1836 election as Rector of Glasgow University. In 1852 it changed its name to Glasgow University Conservative Club, which it remained for 120 years, renaming itself Glasgow University Conservative Association in 1972.

A particular aim of the club, as stated in the 1972 Constitution, was to preserve the dignity of the Rectorial Chair of the university by promoting prominent Conservatives to occupy the position. This has resulted in many famous Conservative candidates, the most notable of whom was Benjamin Disraeli, who was elected to the three-year term in 1871 and 1874.

Today, the Association operates as a forum for students to discuss Conservative politics and participate in events and campaigning in Glasgow and further afield around Scotland. The Association is affiliated with the national Conservative Party through Scottish Young Conservatives which brings together associations of young conservatives throughout Scotland, mainly through university groups.

The Association is operated by a six-strong Executive, which comprises the President, vice-president, Secretary, Treasurer, Outreach Officer, and Union Officer who are elected on an annual basis at the association's Annual General Meeting in May.
The society also boasts having had Ruth Davidson as its honorary President in the past.

Events
The Association executive organises a range of events throughout the academic year. This primarily includes the Annual St Andrew's Day Dinner held every year in November, as well as its monthly 'Pint & Policy' events.
The Association also regularly campaigns for the Conservative Party for elections at all levels across the country.

Presidents

Alumni Project 
In 2011, the Association embarked upon a project to identify all the previous presidents and other office bearers of the Association.

In the Media 
Members of the Association were featured in a documentary that charted the campaign in East Renfrewshire in the run-up to the 2010 general election.
The Association's annual St Andrew's dinner in November 2010 attracted media attention as people opposing government policies on higher education protested outside with Police being called and three protestors being arrested.

References

See also 
Conservative Future Scotland
Scottish Young Conservatives

Conservative
Student wings of political parties in the United Kingdom
Student wings of conservative parties
Conservative
Conservative Future